Mordovia, officially the Republic of Mordovia, is a republic of Russia, located in Eastern Europe. Its capital is the city of Saransk. As of the 2010 Census, the population of the republic was 834,755. Ethnic Russians (53.1%) and Mordvins (39.8%) account for the majority of the population.

History

Early history
The earliest archaeological signs of modern humans in the area of Mordovia are from the Neolithic era. Mordvins are mentioned in written sources from the 6th century. Later, Mordvins were under the influence of both Volga Bulgaria and the Kievan Rus. Mordvin princes sometimes raided Muroma and Volga Bulgaria and often despoiled each other's holdings.

Mongol rule
The Mongols conquered vast areas of Eastern Europe in the 13th century. They established the Khanate of the Golden Horde in 1241, subjugating the area of Mordovia. Mordvins fought against Mongols and later alongside Russians. Mordvin lands territorially belonged to Mukhsha Ulus. The Golden Horde disintegrated in the 1430s, which resulted in some Mordvins becoming subjects of the Khanate of Kazan, whereas others were incorporated into Muscovy.

Part of the Russian Empire
After Ivan IV of Russia annexed the Khanate of Kazan in 1552, the Mordvin lands were subjugated by the Russian monarchy. The Mordvin elite rapidly adopted the Russian language and Russian customs, whereas 1821 saw the publication of the New Testament in Erzya to address the non-elite population. In rural areas, the Mordvin culture was preserved. Russians started to convert Mordvins to Orthodox Christianity in the mid-18th century. Mordvins gave up their own shamanist religion only slowly, however, and many of shamanist features were preserved as parts of local culture, though the population became nominally Christian. Translations of literature to Mordvin languages were mostly religious books. In the 18th century, the Latin alphabet was used to write Mordvin, but from the mid-19th century, Cyrillic was used.

Part of the Soviet Union

During the Russian revolution and civil war, Mordovia was held by Bolsheviks from the beginning of the war. When the Bolsheviks prevailed in the war, Mordovia became a part of the Russian SFSR. In 1925, the Soviet government founded autonomous districts and village councils in the area of the Mordvins. During the Soviet era, two written languages were developed, one based on the Erzya dialect in 1922 and one on the Moksha dialect in 1923, both using Cyrillic script. The autonomous oblast was transformed into the Mordovian Autonomous Soviet Socialist Republic on December 20, 1934. Several forced labor Gulags were established under the Bolsheviks, such as Temlag.

Part of the Russian Federation
When the Soviet Union disintegrated, the Mordovian ASSR proclaimed itself the Mordovian Soviet Socialist Republic in 1990 and remained a part of the Russian Federation. Mordovia was one of only two republics that did not proclaim sovereignty. On January 25, 1994, it was renamed the Republic of Mordovia.

Geography
The republic is located in the eastern part of the East European Plain of Russia. The western part of the republic is situated in the Oka–Don Plain; its eastern and central parts are located in the Volga Upland.

Area: 
Borders:
internal: Nizhny Novgorod Oblast (N), Chuvash Republic (NE/E), Ulyanovsk Oblast (E/SE), Penza Oblast (S/SW), Ryazan Oblast (W/NW)
Highest point:  (crossing of the road from Bolshoy Maresev with the roads to Mokshaley, Pyaigiley, and Picheury)

Rivers

There are 114 rivers in the republic. Major rivers include:
Alatyr River (Erzya: Rator)
Issa River
Moksha River
Satis River
Sivin River
Sura River
Vad River

Lakes
There are approximately five hundred lakes in the republic.

Natural resources
Natural resources include peat, mineral waters, and others.

Climate
The climate is moderately continental.
Average January temperature: 
Average July temperature: 
Average annual precipitation: ~

Administrative divisions

Politics

During the Parade of Sovereignties among other former Russian autonomous republics, Mordovia established a presidency in 1991.

In that same year, Vasily Guslyannikov, a physicist by training, was elected in the general election. Guslyannikov had previously been a senior researcher at the Institute of Power Electronics and was the leader of the republican branch of the Democratic Russia political movement.

In 1993, the Supreme Council of Mordovia abolished the post of president, on the basis of which Guslyannikov was removed from his post. Guslyannikov appealed the action of the supreme legislative body of the republic in the Russian Constitutional Court, but the Constitutional Court declared its conformity with the Constitution of Russia.

The head of the government in the Republic of Mordovia is the Head of the Republic. The office is currently held by Artyom Zdunov, who was made acting head on 18 November 2020. His predecessor was Vladimir Volkov who held the office from 2012.

The State Assembly is the legislature of the republic.

Economy
The most developed industries are machine construction, chemicals, woodworking, and food industries. Most of the industrial enterprises are located in the capital Saransk, as well as in the towns of Kovylkino and Ruzayevka, and in the urban-type settlements of Chamzinka and Komsomolsky.

The largest companies in the region include Unimilk (branch of Danone Russia), Ruzayevsky Chemical Machine-Building Plant, Mordovcement, Saranskkabel.

Demographics

Settlements

Vital statistics
Source: Russian Federal State Statistics Service

Ethnic groups

The Mordvin people are a Volga Finnic group speaking two related languages, Moksha and Erzya. The Mordvins identify themselves as separate ethnic groups: the Erzya and Moksha. Only one-third of all Mordvinic languages speakers live in the Republic of Mordovia. During the Soviet period, school textbooks were published in each language.

According to the 2010 Census, Russians make up 53.4% of the republic's population, while ethnic Erzya and Moksha are 39.8%. Other groups include Tatars (5.2%), Ukrainians (0.6%), and a host of smaller groups, each accounting for less than 0.5% of the total population.

Religion

According to a 2012 survey, 68.6% of the population of Mordovia adhere to the Russian Orthodox Church (there are many churches and monasteries, for example, Monastery of John the Evangelist in Makarovka), 5% are unaffiliated Christians, 2% are Muslims, 1% are Old Believers. In addition, 10% of the population declares to be "spiritual but not religious", 7% are atheist, and 6.4% follow Buddhism only in the city of Saransk. Some Mordvins adhere to the Mordvin native religion.

Education
The most important facilities of higher education include Mordovian State University and Mordovian State Pedagogical Institute in Saransk.

Culture

There are many museums in the republic. The largest ones include the Mordovian Republican United Museum of Regional Studies and the Museum of Mordvinian Culture in Saransk.

The National Library of the Republic of Mordovia is the largest library in the republic.

The State Puppet Theater of the Republic of Mordovia, located in Saransk, is well known in Russia. Most of the plays performed in this theater are Russian fairy-tales.

Erzya literature experienced a renaissance in the 1920s and 1930s.

The House and Museum of F. Sychkov was opened on March 11, 1970, at Kochelaevo, Kovylkinsky District after a reconstruction.

Mordovian cuisine is widespread in the country.

Penal colonies 

Mordovia is home to multiple penal colonies. Prisons in Mordovia are regarded by many as having conditions harsher than most Russian prisons. According to University of Helsinki sociologist Olga Zeveleva, who works with the Gulag Echoes project studying Russian prison conditions, "Prisons in Mordovia are notoriously terrible, even by Russian standards. The prisons there are known for the harsh regimes and human rights violations.” According to The Guardian, a popular saying among female prison inmates in Russia is “If you haven’t done time in Mordovia, you haven’t done time at all.” The prison was built as a part of a system of similar prisons in the region in the 1930s during the Soviet era. University of Oxford scholar Judith Pallot described the prison as being "stuck in time for 50 years." Violence from other prisoners and prison guards is not as frequent as in men's prisons, but isn't uncommon. As of 2022, among the prisoners held in Mordovia's penal colonies is Paul Whelan, a U.S. citizen accused of spying and sentenced to 16 years.

Sport
Mordovia, along with neighbour Chuvashia and Penza Oblast, has given some of the best modern racewalking athletes, both women (Olga Kaniskina, Anisya Kirdyapkina, Elena Lashmanova, Olena Shumkina, Irina Stankina) and men (Sergey Bakulin, Valeriy Borchin, Stanislav Emelyanov, Vladimir Kanaykin, Sergey Kirdyapkin, Sergey Morozov, Denis Nizhegorodov, Roman Rasskazov), apart from Alexei Nemov (see more in the article History of Mordovian sport).

Language

The Mordvinic languages, alternatively Mordvin languages, or Mordvinian languages (Mordovskiye yazyki, the official Russian term for the language pair),
are a subgroup of the Uralic languages, comprising the closely related Erzya language and Moksha language.
Previously considered a single "Mordvin language",
it is now treated as a small language grouping consisting of just two languages. Due to differences in phonology, lexicon, and grammar, Erzya and Moksha are not mutually intelligible, so the Russian language is often used for intergroup communications.

The two Mordvinic languages also have separate literary forms. The Erzya literary language was created in 1922 and the Mokshan in 1923.

The two Mordvinic languages are official languages of Mordovia along with Russian.

See also
Music in Mordovia
History of Mordovian sport

Notes

References

Sources

Государственное Собрание Республики Мордовия (State Assembly of the Republic of Mordovia). "Республика Мордовия. Административно-территориальное деление" (Republic of Mordovia. Administrative-Territorial Division). Саранск, 1998.

External links

Official website of the Republic of Mordovia 
International Relations Office of Mordovian State University 
Official website of Mordovian State University 
Official website of the National Library of the Republic of Mordovia 
Official website of the State Puppet Theater of the Republic of Mordovia 
Encyclopaedia about the Republic of Mordovia 

 
States and territories established in 1934
Russian-speaking countries and territories
Regions of Europe with multiple official languages